The 2015–16 Amkar Perm season was their 12th season in the Russian Premier League, the highest tier of association football in Russia, following promotion during the 2003 season. They participated in the Russian Premier League, finishing 11th, whilst also reaching the Semifinals of the Russian Cup.

Squad

Out on loan

Youth squad

Transfers

Summer

In:

Out:

Winter

In:

Out:

Competitions

Russian Premier League

Matches

Table

Russian Cup

Squad statistics

Appearances and goals

|-
|colspan="14"|Players who left Amkar Perm on loan:

|-
|colspan="14"|Players who left Amkar Perm during the season:

|}

Goal Scorers

Disciplinary record

References

FC Amkar Perm seasons
Amkar Perm